Viaje (English: 'travel') or El Viaje or Un Viaje may refer to:

Film and TV
Viaje (film), a 2015 film
The Journey (1942 film), or El viaje, an Argentine film
The Journey (1992 film) or El viaje, an Argentine film

Books
Un Viaje (book), satirical travelogue by Felipe Pardo y Aliaga, 1840

Music
Viaje (Jason Webley album), 1998
Viaje (Ricardo Arjona album), 2014
De Viaje, a 2003 album by Sin Bandera
Un Viaje (album), by Café Tacuba

Songs
"El Viaje", a song by Antonio Orozco
"El Viaje", a tango composed by Astor Piazzolla
"El Viaje", a song by Eros Ramazzotti
"Un Viaje", a song by Wisin y Yandel from Los Vaqueros